Xuriella marmorea is  a jumping spider species first described in 2007.

Description

Distribution
The species is found in Yemen.

References

Salticidae
Spiders of the Arabian Peninsula
Spiders described in 2007
Taxa named by Wanda Wesołowska